The Indian River is a  river in western New Hampshire in the United States. It is a tributary of the Mascoma River, which in turn flows to the Connecticut River and ultimately Long Island Sound.

The Indian River rises in the southern corner of the town of Dorchester and flows south in a broad valley to the west of Mount Cardigan. At the town center of Canaan, the river turns west and shortly ends at the Mascoma River.

For its south-flowing portion, the Indian River is followed by New Hampshire Route 118. From Canaan to the Mascoma River, U.S. Route 4 is close by.

See also

List of rivers of New Hampshire

References

Rivers of New Hampshire
Tributaries of the Connecticut River
Rivers of Grafton County, New Hampshire